Martin Urban (born 24 April 1972) is a retired Slovak football player.

Playing career
Urban began his playing career with Lokomotíva Košice, Tatran Prešov and Ružomberok before joining PAS Giannina in January 2000. Urban would appear in just 9 Alpha Ethniki matches for PAS Giannina. Next, he moved to Cyprus where he would play for Enosis Neon Paralimni. In January 2005, Urban returned to Slovakia where he would finish his career with MŠK Rimavská Sobota.

References

1972 births
Living people
Slovak footballers
Slovak expatriate footballers
FC Lokomotíva Košice players
MFK Ružomberok players
1. FC Tatran Prešov players
PAS Giannina F.C. players
Enosis Neon Paralimni FC players
MŠK Rimavská Sobota players
Super League Greece players
Cypriot First Division players
Expatriate footballers in Greece
Expatriate footballers in Cyprus
Association football defenders